Buleda (Balochi and ), is a small valley and a Tehsil of Kech District in Balochistan province of Pakistan. It is a part of Makran Division situated in the north of Kech. It is located at an altitude of 503 meters (1653 feet) within the two arms of the central Makran range the Buledai or Kech band being on the south and the Zamuran Hills on the north.

It is a valley with the Gishkaur running through it, expanding here and there into large pools from which water for irrigation is taken in artificial channels, one of which the jawan mardan resembles a small canal. It is known for the abundance of its pasturage, and possesses a fairly extensive irrigated area and many date groves.

Buleda is said to have been the home of Buledai dynasty, there are many Dambis or cairns of the banks of a hill called the Dambani Kaur. There are two main dam which includes :1_suloi dam. 2_ jantari dam The number of permanent Union councils is seven, the principal among which are: Koshk, Sulo, Chib, Bit, Mainaz, Allandoor, and Gilli. The inhabitants are Sunni Muslims. The tribes living in the valley are Buledai, Zahrozai, Kahudai, Rind, Kushk, Khosag, Mugheri, Yallanzai, Palizai, Tajozai, Shambezai, Moradzai, Sanghur, Barr, Rakhshani, Askani, Gicki, and Koh baloch.

Overview

The town is located in southwest of the Balochistan province in Pakistan it is situated north of Turbat close to Iranian border. Buleda was a major city of Baloch tribe and it was named Buledi after the city. The sardars when came for taking taxes from Zamuran so they were defeated by Shambezai, Yalanzai, Durrazai and other Zamurani tribes jointly and they went back. Zamuran is the most rural populated and least developed area in Tehsil Buleda main tribes in Zamuran are Shambezai, Mohmad zai, Buledai, Duraazai, Jamali, Bubbar, Askani, Kohda, shay and Raseey tribes. Also, Mir Kohda Gamani kalat is present at Soorag Zamuran.

Notable people
 Dr Yarjan Abdul Samad, First Pakistani space scientist to work at University of Cambridge.

See also
 Turbat
 Bijarani
 Kashap
 Kech

References

External links 
 Itouchmap Buleda

Populated places in Balochistan, Pakistan